Sophie Poser née Krauel (born 2 March 1985) is a former German track and field athlete who competed in mainly long jump events.

She married her boyfriend Florian Poser in May 2013, he competes in decathlon and they had a baby together in December the same year.

References

1985 births
Living people
Sportspeople from Jena
German female long jumpers
German female hurdlers
German heptathletes
German female sprinters
20th-century German women
21st-century German women